Hartley College ( Hāṭlik Kallūri) is a provincial school in Point Pedro, Sri Lanka. Founded in 1838 by British Methodist missionaries, it is one of Sri Lanka's oldest schools. The school is named after Wesleyan priest and missionary Rev. Hartley.

History
Methodist missionaries from Britain arrived in Ceylon on 29 June 1814. The Wesleyan Mission Central School was founded in 1838 by Rev. Dr. Peter Percival. The school is located at the current location of the Methodist Girls' High School. The school transferred to its current site in 1874. The school was renamed Christ Church School in 1912 and Hartley College in 1916.

Most private schools in Ceylon were taken over by the government in 1960. Hartley College becomes a publicly funded school on 1 December 1960.

Following arson by the Sri Lankan government forces in 1984, the school moved to Puttalai from 1985 to 1990. In 1989, the school appeared on a postage stamp issued to commemorate its 150th anniversary. From 1996 to 2002, part of the school was occupied by the Sri Lanka Army, and the school remains in a high security zone. In 2005, part of the school was destroyed by a grenade thrown from a motorcycle.

Principals

 1838-60 Rev. Dr. Peter Percival
 1861-68 Rev. D. P. Niles
 1868- Samuel Hensman 
 -1878 J. C. T. Sherrard
 1906 S. A. Paulpillai 
 1906-12 S. S. Kanapathipillai
 1912-15 E. S. Abraham
 1915-43 C. P. Thamotheram
 1943-67 K. Pooranampillai
 1967-71 S. Ratnasabapathy
 1971-73 C. Rajathurai
 1973-75 P. Ahamparam 
 1975-85 W. N. S. Samuel
 1985-93 P. Balasingam
 1993-97 K. Nadarajah
 1997-99 P. Venugopalavanithasan
 1999-00 N. Gunaseelan
 2000-02 M. Sripathy 
 2003-05 V. Pathmanathan 
 2005-14 N. Theivendraraja
 2014- T. Mugunthan
 2021- T.Kalaichelvan

Notable teachers

Notable alumni

See also
 List of schools in Northern Province, Sri Lanka

Notes

References

External links
 
 
 
 
 

1838 establishments in Ceylon
Boys' schools in Sri Lanka
Educational institutions established in 1838
Former Methodist schools in Sri Lanka
Provincial schools in Sri Lanka
Schools in Point Pedro
Wesleyan Methodist Mission of Ceylon (North) schools